Tullia Driving her Chariot over the Body of her Father is a 1765 painting by François-Guillaume Ménageot which depicts the Roman princess Tullia driving her chariot over the dead body of her father, the king Servius Tullius. The painting won second prize at the Prix de Rome.

See also
 Tullia Drives over the Corpse of her Father, by Jean Bardin
 Tullia driving her Chariot over her Father, by Giuseppe Bartolomeo Chiari
 Tullia Running Her Chariot over the Body of Her Father, by Michel-François Dandré-Bardon

References

Further reading
 Women in Livy: Tullia Minor

1765 paintings
Cultural depictions of Tullia Minor
Cultural depictions of Servius Tullius